Bodacious Space Pirates is an anime series adapted from the Miniskirt Space Pirates light novels by Yūichi Sasamoto. The anime adaptation is produced by Satelight and directed by Tatsuo Sato. The anime follows Marika Kato, a normal high school girl in the far future who learns her recently deceased father was a space pirate captain. By law, only direct descendants can inherit her father's spaceship, the Bentenmaru, which her father's subordinates ask that she takes over as their new Captain, thus beginning Marika's adventures as a space pirate.

The anime was broadcast on Tokyo MX, MBS and TVK from January 8 to June 30, 2012 and was also simulcast by Crunchyroll. The anime has been licensed in North America by Sentai Filmworks and was released on digital outlets in February 2013, followed by DVD and Blu-ray releases. The ending theme song is "Lost Child" by Momoiro Clover Z.

Episode list

References

Bodacious Space Pirates